Basudeo Singh (died 29 April 2013) was an Indian politician. He was the Bihar MLA for Begusarai from 1990–1995.

References

Bihar MLAs 1990–1995
2013 deaths
Year of birth missing
People from Begusarai
Communist Party of India (Marxist) politicians from Bihar

2. http://biharvidhanparishad.gov.in/Members/BasuSingh.htm